Aksu is a village in Yüksekova District in Hakkâri Province in Turkey. The village is populated by Kurds of the Pinyanişî tribe and had a population of 539 in 2022.

The village is located near Hakkari–Yüksekova Airport.

History 
The village was populated by 15 Assyrian families in 1850 and 20 families in 1877.

Population 
Population history of the village from 2000 to 2022:

References 

Villages in Yüksekova District
Kurdish settlements in Hakkâri Province
Historic Assyrian communities in Turkey